The Visit is a collection of poems by Ian Hamilton published in 1970 by Faber and Faber. This was a somewhat reworked and expanded version of the 1964 pamphlet. The thirty-three poems contained in The Visit all reflect Hamilton's concise writing style. Hamilton subsequently spoke about the relationship between the stressful circumstances of his personal life — in particular the mental illness of his wife; and the brevity of the poems.

Notes

External links 
 Official Ian Hamilton Website: www.ianhamilton.org

1970 poetry books
English poetry collections